Dorposz Szlachecki is a village in the administrative district of Gmina Kijewo Królewskie, within Chełmno County, Kuyavian-Pomeranian Voivodeship, in north-central Poland. It is located in the Chełmno Land in the historic region of Pomerania.

History
During the German occupation (World War II), in 1939, the German Selbstschutz established a jail for Poles from the region in the local pre-war Polish police station. Around 400 Poles were imprisoned and then massacred in nearby Małe Czyste as part of the Intelligenzaktion. Polish teachers from Dorposz Szlachecki were murdered by the Germans in a massacre of Poles committed in nearby Klamry, also as part of the Intelligenzaktion. In 1941, the occupiers also carried out expulsions of Poles, whose farms were then handed over to German colonists as part of the Lebensraum policy.

References

Villages in Chełmno County